Albania competed at the 2012 Summer Olympics in London, United Kingdom from 27 July to 12 August 2012. This was the nation's seventh appearance at the Olympics since its debut in 1972. The National Olympic Committee of Albania sent a total of 11 athletes to the Games, seven men and four women, to compete in four sports. Weightlifter Hysen Pulaku was officially removed from the team on the first day, after failing a drug test for the banned anabolic steroid substance, as announced by the International Olympic Committee. Albania, however, has yet to win its first ever Olympic medal.

The Albanians competed in five sports with the same number of athletes like they did at the 2008 Summer Olympics in Beijing in China. 
 
This time around they couldn't improve on their previous achievements as they didn't future their two Wrestlers in Elis Guri and Sahit Prizreni.
 
Albania competed in Judo with World Judo Juniors Champion of 2009 and twice  European Junior Champion of 2009 and 2010  Majlinda Kelmendi, who made her debut at the Olympic games. She competed at the Women's 52 kg event. In the first round she defeated Jaana Sundberg from Finland. Before losing in the round of 16 to Mauritian Judoka Legentil.
 
In Weightlifting Albania initially competed with four athletes three men and one female. Briken Calja had the best result for Albania as he finished 6th in his debut for Albania lifting 320 kg in total. Romela Begaj competed for the second time for Albania but this time she wasn't able to improve on her result from the previous olympics as she finished 9th in the end.

Athletics

Albania has qualified 1 female quota place, and selected 1 male athlete by wildcard.

Track & road events

Field events

Judo

Albania had not initially qualified a judoka, but due to the International Olympic Committee's refusal to allow Kosovars of Albanian ethnicity to represent Kosovo or to compete as independent athletes, Majlinda Kelmendi represented Albania at the 2012 Summer Olympics.

Shooting

Swimming

Albanian swimmers are invited. One men and female.

Weightlifting

Albania has qualified three men and one female quota places. On 28 July, the International Olympic Committee announced that Hysen Pulaku had tested positive for stanozolol, a banned anabolic steroid, and consequently ejected him from the games.

See also
 Albania at the 2010 European Aquatics Championships
 Albania at the 2011 World Aquatics Championships

Notes

References

External links

Nations at the 2012 Summer Olympics
2012
2012 in Albanian sport